The Bott Radio Network is a network of Christian radio stations in the United States, broadcasting Christian talk and teaching programs.

Programs heard on the Bott Radio Network include Love Worth Finding with Adrian Rogers, In Touch with Charles Stanley, Turning Point with David Jeremiah, Back to the Bible with Bryan Clark, Truth for Life with Alistair Begg, Jay Sekulow Live, Janet Mefferd Today and Running to Win with Erwin Lutzer.

Affiliate stations
The Bott Radio Network currently operates 120 stations in 14 states.

Note: Markets currently listed in this table are each station's marketed city, not actual city of license, and callsigns currently listed are for the related full-power station, not the actual translator on that frequency.

References

External links
Bott Radio Network's official website
Bott Radio Network's webcast
Bott Radio Network on iHeartRadio

Christian radio stations in Nebraska
Christian radio stations in Missouri
American radio networks
Bott Radio Network stations
Radio broadcasting companies of the United States